Jorja Alice Smith (born 11 June 1997) is an English singer-songwriter. Born and raised in Walsall, West Midlands, she has been writing songs since the age of 11. In 2012, Smith's friend uploaded her cover of Labrinth's "Earthquake" to YouTube, which led to her discovery by record producer Guy Moot. After her first two singles received broader recognition, she signed with Sony/ATV in 2016, releasing two EPs throughout 2016 and 2017.

Her debut studio album, Lost & Found, was released in 2018 to critical acclaim, and peaked at number three on the UK Albums Chart. The same year, Smith won the Brit Critics' Choice Award. In 2019, she was named Best British Female Artist at the Brit Awards and was also nominated for the Grammy Award for Best New Artist. Her third EP Be Right Back, which was released in May 2021, received favourable reviews.

Early life 
Jorja Smith was born on 11 June 1997 in Walsall, West Midlands, to a Jamaican father and an English mother. Her father Peter, a benefits officer, is a former musician who sang in a neo-soul group called 2nd Naicha before Smith was born, and her mother, Jolene, is a jewellery designer. Smith has a younger brother, Luca, and is the cousin of Rangers player Kemar Roofe.

She began taking piano lessons at the age of 8 at the encouragement of her father. Smith earned a music scholarship at Aldridge School, where she learned the oboe and studied classical singing, before taking music for her A-level exams. She was scouted by a manager at the age of 15 after uploading videos of herself singing cover songs on YouTube. Shortly after, she began travelling to London for writing sessions with Maverick Sabre and Ed Thomas, while still in school. After graduation, she moved to London at the age of 18 where she supported herself by working as a barista, and continued to write songs.

Career

2015–2019: First EPs, and Lost & Found 
In Late 2015, Maverick Sabre co-signed Smith publicly. In January 2016, Smith released her debut single "Blue Lights", which samples Dizzee Rascal's song "Sirens", on SoundCloud; the song garnered 400,000 plays on the website within a month. Her second single "Where Did I Go?", released in May, was singled out by Drake as his favourite track of the moment in Entertainment Weekly in July. Following the worldwide recognition and exposure Smith gained from Drake, Smith caught the attention of Guy Moot. Moot, an executive and worldwide creative at Sony/ATV with mainstream industry connections, signed Smith to a publishing deal in late 2016. In November 2016, she released her four-track debut extended play, Project 11. The same month, Smith was selected as one of the fifteen rising acts on BBC Music's Sound of 2017 longlist, and finished fourth on the list.

Smith performed as a special guest on Drake's Boy Meets World Tour in February and March 2017, and featured on two tracks on his mixtape More Life (2017). She released the song "Beautiful Little Fools" on International Women's Day; the title is a reference to the novel The Great Gatsby. In May, she featured on Kali Uchis' song "Tyrant", the lead single off Uchis' debut studio album Isolation (2018). She released her third single, "Teenage Fantasy", in June. Two months later, Smith and grime artist Preditah released a single together called "On My Mind". In September 2017, she began dating singer and producer Joel Compass.

She performed as the opening act on Bruno Mars' 24K Magic World Tour in October and November 2017. In December, it was announced that Smith would be the recipient of the Brit Critics' Choice Award, to be presented at the Brits nominations launch on 13 January 2018. She is the first independent artist to have been nominated for the award, let alone win.

In January 2018, she released the single "Let Me Down" featuring rapper Stormzy. Smith co-wrote and performed the song "I Am" on Kendrick Lamar's soundtrack album for the film Black Panther, released in February. Later that month, she performed at the BRIT Awards with Rag'n'Bone Man. In April, she made her US television debut on Jimmy Kimmel Live! with a performance of "Blue Lights". Her debut studio album, Lost & Found, written over a five-year period, was announced in April and released in June 2018 to critical acclaim. In the month of the album's release, Smith began touring in support of the album, with dates scheduled across Europe and festival appearances in Japan. The Lost & Found Tour's North American leg began on 19 November in Seattle and conclude on 19 December in Toronto and will be supported by Ravyn Lenae.

In 2019, Smith announced a co-headlining North American tour with Kali Uchis starting on 28 April in Washington, D.C. and concluding in Toronto on 30 May. In August 2019, Smith released the single "Be Honest" featuring Burna Boy.

2020–present: Be Right Back 
In early 2020, Smith began hosting a 12-part BBC Radio 3 show called 'Tearjerker', which focuses on the healing power of music. She released two singles that year: "By Any Means" and "Come Over" featuring Popcaan.

On 14 May 2021, she released her third extended play Be Right Back, which received generally positive reviews.

Influences 
Smith grew up listening to reggae, punk, hip-hop, and R&B, and wrote her first song at the age of 11. She describes being "obsessed" with Amy Winehouse's 2003 debut album Frank as a teenager and was inspired by the singer's raw approach to songwriting. Smith said her songs are about social issues: "When things are going on in the world, I think it's important to touch on them, because as a musician, you can make people listen. As soon as people press play, you've got their attention."
She cites Lauryn Hill, Adele, Amy Winehouse, Sade, Nina Simone, Alicia Keys, Mos Def and the Streets as influences. Style wise, Smith cites Rihanna as the sole fashion icon she is inspired by.

Discography

Studio albums

EPs

Singles

As lead artist

Promotional singles

As featured artist

Other charted and certified songs

Other guest appearances

Music videos

Tours

Headlining 
Lost and Found Tour (2018)

Co-headlining 
The Kali & Jorja Tour  (2019)

Awards and nominations 

{| class=wikitable
|-
! Year !! Awards !! Work !! Category !! Result
|-
| 2016
| rowspan="4"|MOBO Awards
| "Blue Lights"
| Best Song
| rowspan="5" 
|-
| rowspan="4"|2017
| rowspan="8" 
| Best Female
|-
| Best Newcomer
|-
| Best R&B/Soul Act
|-
| BET Awards
| International Viewers' Choice Award
|-
| rowspan="11"|2018
| Brit Awards
| Critics' Choice
| 
|-
| Q Awards
| Q Breakthrough Act
| 
|-
| rowspan="3"|AIM Independent Music Awards
| UK Breakthrough of the Year
| 
|-
| Most Played New Independent Act
| rowspan="3" 
|-
| rowspan="2"|Lost & Found
| Independent Album of the Year
|-
| Mercury Prize
| Album of the Year
|-
| UK Music Video Awards
| "Blue Lights"
| Best Urban Video – UK
| 
|-
| MTV Europe Music Awards
| 
| Best Push
| rowspan="7" 
|-
| Urban Music Awards
| Lost & Found
| Best Album
|-
| rowspan="2"|Soul Train Music Awards
| rowspan="4" 
| Best New Artist
|-
| Soul Train Certified Award
|-
| rowspan="9"|2019
| Grammy Awards
| Best New Artist
|-
| Sweden GAFFA Awards
| Best Foreign New Act
|-
| rowspan="3"| Brit Awards
| Lost & Found
| British Album of the Year
|-
| rowspan="2" 
| British Female Solo Artist
| 
|-
| British Breakthrough Act
| rowspan="5" 
|-
| Ivor Novello Awards
| "Blue Lights"
| Best Contemporary Song
|-
| AIM 2019 Independent Music Awards
| 
| Most Played New Independent Artist
|-
| rowspan="2"|UK Music Video Awards
| rowspan="2"|"Be Honest"
| Best Urban Video – UK
|-
| Best Production Design in a Video

Nominated for a uk MVA for by any means 

|-

Notes

References

External links 

 
 

1997 births
21st-century Black British women singers
 British contemporary R&B singers
 English women pop singers
 English people of Jamaican descent
 English soul singers
 Living people
 Musicians from the West Midlands (county)
 People from Walsall
 Decca Records artists
 English women in electronic music